The Körte-Oberlyzeum was a girls' gymnasium in Königsberg, Germany. It was named after mayor Siegfried Körte.

History

The Oberlyzeum was formed in 1925 when the city of Königsberg combined two private schools, the Seydel-Lyzeum of Theaterstraße in Burgfreiheit and the Günther-Lyzeum of Steindamm. The new institution was located in the former Altstadt Gymnasium, as that building had been vacated to form Stadtgymnasium Altstadt-Kneiphof. In 1935, the Maria-Krause-Lyzeum of Schnürlingstraße in Hintere Vorstadt was closed and merged into the Körte-Oberlyzeum. The school was destroyed during the 1944 bombing of Königsberg in World War II.

Notes

References

1925 establishments in Germany
1945 disestablishments in Germany
Buildings and structures in Germany destroyed during World War II
Defunct schools in Germany
Education in Königsberg
Educational institutions established in 1925
Educational institutions disestablished in 1944
Girls' schools in Germany
Gymnasiums in Germany